Rescission is the noun form of the verb "to rescind." It may refer to:

 Rescission (contract law)
 Rescission bill, a procedure to rescind previously appropriated funding in the United States
 A synonym for repeal in parliamentary procedure
 Several bills which have used the term in their names:
 The Rescissory Act 1661, by which the Scottish parliament annulled the legislation of the last twenty years, covering the time of the Commonwealth and Wars of the Three Kingdoms.
 The Rescission Act of 1946, a United States law that retroactively annulled benefits that would have been payable to Filipino troops during the time that the Philippines was a U.S. territory